Luigi Gatti (October 7, 1740 – March 1, 1817) was a classical composer. He was born in Lazise in 1740, the son of an organist, Francesco della Gatta. He was ordained a priest in Mantua. In the 1780s he became Hofkapellmeister in Salzburg and Leopold Mozart showed his irritation at not receiving it himself. Between 1801 and 1804 Gatti helped Mozart's sister, Nannerl to locate unknown pieces by Mozart. He died in Salzburg in 1817.

He is famous for writing oratorios, cantatas, sextets and septets.

Famous works
Septet concertante in F for oboe, 2 horns, violin, viola, cello and double bass
Sextet in E flat for English horn, bassoon, violin, viola, cello and double bass
Concerto per pianoforte e orchestra in do Maggiore L7e5

Notes

External links
 

Italian Classical-period composers
1740 births
1817 deaths
Accademia Nazionale di Arte Drammatica Silvio D'Amico alumni
Italian male classical composers
People from the Province of Verona
19th-century Italian male musicians